James M. Hession (5 November 1912 – 12 January 1999) was an Irish Fine Gael politician and solicitor who served as a Teachta Dála (TD), representing the Galway North constituency in Dáil Éireann. Hession was elected at the 1951 general election, was re-elected at the 1954 general election but lost his seat at the 1957 general election.

References

1912 births
1999 deaths
Fine Gael TDs
Members of the 14th Dáil
Members of the 15th Dáil
Politicians from County Galway
Irish solicitors
20th-century Irish lawyers